Local elections were held in the West Bank on 12 April 1976, on the order of Israeli military authorities and under the 1955 Jordanian municipal elections law. About 63,000 voters cast their ballot, a voter turnout of 72.3%. The result was a victory for supporters of the Palestine Liberation Organization.

Background
The holding of elections was the idea of Shimon Peres, who hoped to establish moderate local leadership in the West Bank that would accept his idea of autonomy. The elections were held under an amended version of the 1955 Jordanian electoral law, which granted the right to vote to all Palestinians over the age of 21, the law having previously restricted the franchise to male property owners. The changes in the franchise were opposed by Jordan, citing the Fourth Geneva Convention, which stated that an occupying power should maintain the status quo in any occupied territories", although the PLO supported the reform.

Results
The elections saw a change in demographic of the elected politicians; 67% were under 50 compared to 40% in the 1972 elections. The proportion of white-collar workers also increased from 20% to 40%. Fourteen of the 24 elected mayors were new to office.

Aftermath
Mohammed Milhim was exiled by Israel in 1980 for being a member of the PLO Executive Committee, as was Fahd Qawasmeh, whilst eight other mayors were removed from office in 1982.

References

West Bank
1976 in the Israeli Military Governorate
Elections in Palestine (region)
Local elections in Palestine